Edmund Nigel Ramsay Crisp, Baron Crisp  (born 14 January 1952) is a crossbench member of the House of Lords where he co chairs the All-Party Parliamentary Group on Global Health. He works and publishes extensively in global health and international development. He was a British senior civil servant in the Department of Health, public policy analyst, and Senior Manager in the NHS. He was awarded a life peerage upon retirement.

Background and personal life
Crisp was educated at Uppingham School and then studied philosophy at St John's College, Cambridge.

Crisp is married with two children, and lives in the countryside near Newbury. His interests include the countryside, gardening and painting.

Career
Crisp joined the NHS in 1986 from a background in community work, where he worked in Liverpool and Cambridgeshire, and industry and (from 1981 to 1986) was Secretary and Director of Age Concern Cambridge. He then became the General Manager for Learning Disabilities in East Berkshire and moved in 1988 to become General Manager (and later Chief Executive) of Heatherwood and Wexham Park Hospitals which provided a wide range of general hospital and mental health services in East Berkshire. He moved to Oxford in 1993 to become Chief Executive of the Oxford Radcliffe Hospitals NHS Trust which at the time incorporated the John Radcliffe and Churchill Hospitals and is one of the largest academic medical centres in the country. Crisp became South Thames Regional Director of the NHS Executive in 1997 and London Regional Director in 1999.

Crisp was appointed as the fifth chief executive of the NHS and Permanent Secretary at the Department of Health on 1 November 2000. He is unlike his predecessors or successor in combining these posts. On 8 March 2006 Crisp announced his intention to retire at the end of March, acknowledging the current financial problems of parts of the NHS as a disappointment. He was praised by the prime minister, Tony Blair, for his contribution to British healthcare and was created Baron Crisp, of Eaglescliffe in the County of Durham, on 28 April 2006. He was replaced by Sir Ian Carruthers, as acting NHS Chief Executive, and Hugh Taylor, the Director of Strategy and Business Development, as acting Permanent Secretary.  

In 2016, a biography of Tony Blair – Broken Vows: Tony Blair, The Tragedy of Power by British author Tom Bower, reported Ken Anderson's comment "Crisp had no control over costs and didn’t have a clue what to do", following the former's investigation into why the NHS accounts were six months late. Bowers describes that after an assessment by management consultants McKinsey & Company, Tony Blair and Secretary of State for Health Patricia Hewitt decided Crisp should be replaced, and part of the method used to induce Crisp to resign at age 54 was to award him a life peerage.

Global health and international development
Nigel Crisp has been very active in global health and international development since 2006; most notably publishing in 2007 Global Health Partnerships - a report for the prime minister on what more the UK can do to support health improvement in developing countries; co-chairing, with Commissioner Bience Gawanas of the African Union, a Task Force on scaling up the education and training of health workers on behalf of the Global Health Workforce Alliance which resulted in the publication of Scaling up, Saving lives in 2008; and founding, with the Zambian Ministry of Health, The Zambia UK Health Workforce Alliance in 2009. He writes and speaks widely on global health and his book Turning the world upside down - the search for global health was published in 2010.

In 2018 he founded and subsequently co-chaired with Sheila Tlou, the former health minister of Botswana, Nursing Now. Nursing Now was designed to raise the profile and status of nurses globally and was very successful with 126 countries joining the campaign with more than 750 national, regional and local groups active when it concluded in May 2021. It was succeeded by the Nursing Now Challenge which aims to provide leadership development opportunities for 100,000 young nurses and midwives globally. See https://www.nursingnow.org/

He chaired Sightsavers International from 2007 to 2013 co-chairs the All Party Parliamentary Group on Global Health, is a Senior Fellow of the Institute for Healthcare Improvement, a Distinguished Visiting Fellow at the Harvard School of Public Health and an Honorary Professor at the London School of Hygiene and Tropical Medicine.

Honours
He was appointed Knight Commander of the Order of the Bath (KCB) in the New Years Honours 2003.

Books
 Crisp N: turning the World Upside Down Again - global health in a time of pandemics, climate change and political turmoil.To be published by CRC Press in March 2022.
Crisp N. Health is Made at Home, Hospitals are for Repairs; Salus, 2020
Crisp, N. Turning the world upside down - the search for global health in the 21st Century, CRC Press, 2010
 Crisp, N. 24 hours to save the NHS: The Chief Executive's account of reform 2000 - 2006, Oxford University Press, 2011
 Crisp, N. & Omaswa, F (ed.) African health leaders: Making change and claiming the future, Oxford University Press, 2014

Arms

References

External links
 Nigelcrisp.com, Personal website
Nigel Crisp, Reforming the Global Health System: Lessons from Asia (Asia Policy, July 2010)

1952 births
Living people
Permanent Under-Secretaries of State for Health
Knights Commander of the Order of the Bath
Crossbench life peers
Alumni of St John's College, Cambridge
Fellows of St John's College, Cambridge
People educated at Uppingham School
Chief Executives of the National Health Service
People from Ascot, Berkshire
Members of the National Academy of Medicine
Life peers created by Elizabeth II